Mother Hedwig (Jadwiga) Borzęcka (1 February 1863 – 27 September 1906) was co-foundress of the Congregation of the Sisters of the Resurrection along with her natural mother, Mother Celine Borzęcka.

She was born Hedwig Borzęcka in the Russian Empire.  Her father was Joseph (Józef) Borzęcki. On 17 December 1982, this Servant of God was declared as having heroic virtue by Pope John Paul II, thus becoming known as the Venerable Mother Hedwig Borzęcka.

1863 births
1906 deaths
Russian Empire Servants of God
Founders of Catholic religious communities
Roman Catholics from the Russian Empire
Nuns from the Russian Empire
20th-century venerated Christians
Venerated Catholics by Pope John Paul II

Polish Servants of God